The Kyoto Hannaryz (京都ハンナリーズ Kyōto Hannarīzu) are a Japanese basketball team playing in Kyoto Prefecture; they are part of the Western Conference of the B.League. The Hannaryz are coached by Roy Rana.

Coaches
David Benoit (2009–10)
Kazuto Aono
Honoo Hamaguchi
Shinya Ogawa (ja)
Roy Rana

Roster

Notable players

Arenas
Hannaryz Arena
Muko Citizens Gymnasium
Fukuchiyama Sandan-ike Park Gymnasium
Sun Arena

References

Team homepage 

 
Basketball teams in Japan
Sport in Kyoto
Sports teams in Kyoto Prefecture
Basketball teams established in 2009
2009 establishments in Japan